Peyton is an unincorporated community in Claiborne County, Mississippi, United States.

Peyton had a post office from 1900 to 1935.

The Peyton Lookout Tower is located east of the settlement.

References

Unincorporated communities in Claiborne County, Mississippi
Unincorporated communities in Mississippi